Willi Pfeiffer (27 March 1895 – 12 March 1965) was a German footballer. He played club football with Eintracht Frankfurt and Kickers Offenbach.

Pfeiffer played for Frankfurter Kickers who merged with Victoria Frankfurt in 1911 to form Frankfurter FV that eventually became Eintracht Frankfurt in 1920. Between September and November 1922 he shortly played for Kickers Offenbach. In 1929–30 he was part of the Eintracht team that won the Southern German championship and again in 1931–32

For his performances he was called up to the Southern German selection.

Pfeiffer was described as a short-tempered player that tended to his opponents. Due to an assault in the Frankfurt derby between Eintracht and FSV Frankfurt in the 1927–28 campaign Pfeiffer was banned for a year.

In 1932 Pfeiffer left Eintracht to join Union Niederrad as a player-manager but finished his active career in the same year.

In 1938 Pfeiffer wrote a letter to the mayor describing himself as a national socialist despite there's no record that Pfeiffer ever entered the Nazi party. On the other hand, he had a long lasting friendship with former Eintracht track and field athlete Jew Moritz Fröhlich who emigrated to the United States. Pfeiffer sent Fröhlich a family picture as a souvenir. However, Pfeiffer was described as a conflicting character.

In 1945 he shortly acted as a caretaker manager for Eintracht.

Pfeiffer he was an honorary club member, honorary captain and member of the council of elders at Eintracht Frankfurt.

Honours
 Nordkreis-Liga
 Champion: 1911–12, 1912–13, 1913–14
 Southern German Championship
 Runner-up: 1912–13, 1913–14

 Kreisliga Nordmain
 Champion: 1919–20, 1920–21
 Runner-up: 1921–22

 Bezirksliga Main-Hessen:
 Champion: 1927–28, 1928–29, 1929–30, 1930–31, 1931–32

 Southern German championship
 Champion: 1929–30, 1931–32
 Runner-up: 1927–28, 1930–31

 German Championship
 Runner-up: 1932

References

Sources

External links
 Willi Pfeiffer at eintracht-archiv.de

1895 births
1965 deaths
German footballers
Eintracht Frankfurt players
Kickers Offenbach players
Eintracht Frankfurt managers
Association football midfielders